Cadder (Scottish Gaelic: Coille Dobhair) is a district of the town of Bishopbriggs, East Dunbartonshire, Scotland. It is located 7 km north of Glasgow city centre, 0.5 km south of the River Kelvin, and approximately 1.5 km north-east of Bishopbriggs town centre, sited on the route of the Forth and Clyde Canal. Similarly, within Cadder, there is Cawder Golf Club, which also uses that original pronunciation.

History

In antiquity, Cadder was the site of a Roman fort on the route of the Antonine Wall. Its neighbouring forts are Balmuildy to the west and Kirkintilloch to the east although there are intermediate fortlets at Wilderness Plantation to the west and Glasgow Bridge to the east. The Second Legion may have been responsible for building the fort. John Clarke of the Glasgow Archaeological Society excavated the remains in the 1930s. Sir George Macdonald also wrote about the excavation of the site. The site was destroyed by sand quarrying in the 1940s. A sketch of the medieval motte made by Skinner still survives. One find at Cadder was an oil lamp which is associated with the bath house of the fort. Before the Reformation the lands of Cadder and the kirk belonged to the Bishops of Glasgow. In the 18th century James Dunlop of Garnkirk being a wealthy landowner opposed Thomas Muir and the congregation at Cadder over who appointed their minister. Cadder Parish Church was described in the 19th century as a neat modern Gothic church. Cadder House was a property held by the Stirling family for generations.

Cadder Today
Cadder has a large cemetery, is also the site of Strathkelvin Retail Park and Low Moss (HM Prison).

Gallery

References

Forts of the Antonine Wall
Suburbs in East Dunbartonshire
Civil parishes of Scotland
Bishopbriggs